Martín Albano Pautasso (Born May 17, 1979 in Justiniano Posse, Córdoba) is an Argentine football player who usually plays as a full back.

Pautasso started his career at Argentine 2nd Division Banfield in 1998. Two years later he transferred to Club de Gimnasia y Esgrima La Plata in the Primera Division Argentina. In 2005, he moved to Club Atlético Independiente but was sold to AEK Athens FC after only one season in Avellaneda.

On 30 April 2007, Pautasso was released from AEK Athens as he did not manage to convince his manager Lorenzo Serra Ferrer of his ability. He played in 15 Greek Superleague games and scored 1 goal. He also played in 4 European matches, without scoring. Of the total 19 games that he played for AEK he was in the starting eleven 16 times.

Pautasso went on trial at Major League Soccer side FC Dallas in December 2007 and in January 2008, Pautasso signed a year contract with Olimpia of Asunción, Paraguay.

External links 
 Argentine Primera statistics
 Player profile - L'Equipe.fr

Argentine footballers
Association football defenders
Club Atlético Banfield footballers
Club de Gimnasia y Esgrima La Plata footballers
Club Atlético Independiente footballers
AEK Athens F.C. players
Club Olimpia footballers
Club Atlético Huracán footballers
Independiente Rivadavia footballers
Argentine Primera División players
Super League Greece players
Argentine expatriate footballers
Expatriate footballers in Greece
Expatriate footballers in Paraguay
Sportspeople from Córdoba Province, Argentina
1979 births
Living people